The Mendoza class were a series of three destroyers built in the United Kingdom for the Argentine Navy in the 1920s. They were the first part of the Argentine re-armament programme of the 1920s. Construction began in 1927 and all three were commissioned in 1929. All three destroyers were converted to anti-aircraft escorts in 1958 and remained in service until 1962 when they were discarded.

Design 

The ships were based on the British Admiralty type flotilla leader design built at the end of World War I, with minor modifications.

The Mendoza class were equipped with Parsons single-reduction geared turbines powered by steam provided by four  three-drum boilers. The destroyers had a complement of 160 officers and ratings.

Ships of the Mendoza class were equipped with five  QF Mark IX guns located in single turrets along the centreline of the ship. The Mendoza-class destroyers were also given one  gun for anti-aircraft (AA) defence and two 2-pounder pom poms. They were also armed with six  torpedo tubes in two triple mounts. The 3-inch, both 2-pounder and "Q" gun were later swapped out for six 40 mm Bofors guns in 3 twin mountings for AA defense, arranged either side and abaft the second funnel.

Ships in class

Service history
Contracts were placed with J. Samuel White in 1927 as part of the Argentine Navy's modernisation programme. The three vessels took on the names of destroyers under construction during World War I that had been appropriated by France and Germany. All three ships exceeded their design speed during sea trials, with La Rioja reaching the fastest speed at  without exceeding the limits of its engines. After all three ships had been accepted by the Argentine Navy, the three destroyers sailed for Argentina together from the United Kingdom, stopping only at Lisbon, Portugal en route. Argentina remained neutral during World War II.

In 1952, the Mendoza class' designation was changed from Exploradores (destroyer) to Torpederos (destroyer escort) in 1952 and their pennant numbers changed from "E" to "T" to reflect that. La Rioja and Tucuman were laid up that year and disarmed. The class were converted to anti-submarine escorts in 1958. Mendoza remained in service until 1961, when the last of the class was decommissioned. The class was discarded on 30 April 1962 and replaced with former United States Navy ships that were acquired cheaply.

See also 
 List of ships of the Argentine Navy

Notes

Citations

Bibliography

Further reading 
 Guillermo J. Montehengo, An Argentinian Naval Buildup in the Disarmament Era, in Warship 2002-2003, Conway's Maritime press.

External links 

  Destroyers ("Destructores (Tambien llamados Torpederos)") – Histarmar website

 
Destroyer classes
World War II destroyers of Argentina
Argentina–United Kingdom military relations